Zebulon Elijah (1836 or 1838 - 1910) became a state legislator and government official in Florida after having been enslaved. He was born in Santa Rosa County, Florida. Elijah served in the Florida House of Representatives from 1871 to 1873 representing Escambia County. He later became a postmaster in Pensacola from 1874 to 1878 and a tax assessor in Pensacola from 1881 to 1882. He resigned from the legislature after the passage of a Federal law prohibiting federally appointed officials from also holding state or municipal offices. George E. Wentworth also served as postmaster in Pensacola.

See also
List of African-American officeholders during the Reconstruction era

References

Year of birth uncertain
1910 deaths
American former slaves
Members of the Florida House of Representatives
19th-century American politicians
African-American politicians during the Reconstruction Era
African-American state legislators in Florida
People from Santa Rosa County, Florida
People from Pensacola, Florida
Florida postmasters
1830s births
20th-century African-American people